Suzy J. Styles is a psychologist with Nanyang Technological University (NTU), Singapore. Her research is in the area of psycholinguistics and cognitive approaches to language acquisition. She is the director of the Brain, Language and Intersensory Perception Lab at NTU. She is fond of conducting multiple research projects on the already well-known bouba/kiki effect, which is the predominant topic in her oeuvre as a psychologist studying phonological phenomena.

In 2017 she and Nora Turoman published a paper in Royal Society Open Science that found that research subjects could guess the sounds represented by letters from unfamiliar alphabets better than would be expected from simple chance indicating the possibility of an innate ability to understand writing.

Selected publications
 Hung S., Styles S.J. & Hsieh P. (2017). "Can a Word Sound Like a Shape Before You Have Seen It? Sound-Shape Mapping Prior to Conscious Awareness", Psychological Science, 28(3), 263–275.
 Woon F.T. & Styles S.J. (2016, February). "Linguistic Sound Symbolism and Learning to Read: Developing a large-scale screening for pre-schoolers", paper presented at International Symposium on Cognitive Neuroscience, Singapore.
 Liew K., Lindborg P.M. & Styles S.J. (2016, February). "Auditory Roughness: A new dimension in cross-modal perception", paper presented at International Symposium on Cognitive Neuroscience, Singapore.
 Shang N. & Styles, S.J. (2016). Special Issue: Proceedings Si15. Singapore, August 2015: "An implicit association test on audiovisual cross-modal correspondences", 2nd International Symposium of Sound and Interactivity (pp. 50–51) ICMA Array.
 Lim J. & Styles S.J. (2016). Special Issue: Proceedings Si15. Singapore, August 2015: "Guitar Face: Super-normal integration of sound and vision in Performance", 2nd International Symposium of Sound and Interactivity (pp. 45-‐49) ICMA Array.

See also
 Bouba/kiki effect

References

External links
 

Living people
Australian psychologists
Academic staff of Nanyang Technological University
Alumni of the University of Oxford
Australian National University alumni
Year of birth missing (living people)
Australian women psychologists
Psycholinguists